The Parliament of Tanzania is made up of 239 constituencies which elect a Member of Parliament for a five-year term.

List

References

constituencies
Tanzania
Constituencies